Coronet is a type of crown.

Coronet may also refer to:

Animals
 Coronet or coronary band, an anatomical name for a part of a horse's leg just above the hoof.
 Coronet, several species of hummingbirds in the genus Boissonneaua
 Coronet, the moth species Craniophora ligustri
 Coronet (horse) (born 2014), Thoroughbred racehorse

Businesses
 Coronet Camera Company, a British camera manufacturer in business from 1926 to 1967
 Coronet Films, a producer and distributor of American educational films in business from 1946 until the 1970s
 Coronet Industries, a phosphate company operating outside Plant City, Florida

Music
 The Coronet, a music venue and former cinema in the Elephant and Castle area of London
 Epiphone Coronet, a solid-body electric guitar
 The cornet, a brass instrument

Places
 Coronet Apartments, a property in West Hollywood, California
 Coronet Cinema, a cinema and former theatre in Notting Hill, London
 Coronet Peak, a popular ski mountain in Queenstown, New Zealand
 Coronet Theatre (Los Angeles), a former theatre in Los Angeles
 Coronet Theatre, former name of the Eugene O'Neill Theatre in New York (1945–1959)

Transport
 Dodge Coronet, a model of full-size American automobile
 Coronet (automobile), a British three-wheel microcar
 Coronet (yacht), built in 1885
 Coronet, a yacht built in 1928 and  renamed USS Opal (PYc-8) for service in the United States Navy during World War II 
 USS Coronet (SP-194), a United States Navy patrol boat in commission from 1917 to 1919

Other uses
 Operation Coronet, the invasion of the Japanese island of Honshū by the Allies in Operation Downfall in World War II
 Coronet (typeface), a decorative typeface
 Coronet, a model of electric typewriter manufactured by Smith-Corona
 Coronet (magazine), an American magazine
 Coronet Books, an imprint of Hodder & Stoughton
 Coronet, a brand of paper towels made by Georgia-Pacific
 Mt. Coronet, a location in the video games Pokémon Diamond and Pearl and Pokémon Platinum
 Coronet Highlands, a location in the video game Pokémon Legends: Arceus

See also 
 Kind Hearts and Coronets, a British film
 Cornet (disambiguation)
 Cornette